Von Johnson may refer to:

Vaughan Johnson (1962–2019), American football player
Vaughan Johnson (politician) (1947–2023), Australian politician
Vaughn Johnson (born 1960), New Zealand cricketer
Ace Von Johnson, guitarist
Barbara von Johnson (born 1942), German illustrator and artist